Golmaal is a 2012 Indian Kannada-language comedy film directed by Pramod Chakravarthy in his directorial debut and starring Vijay Raghavendra and Shubha Poonja.

Cast 
Vijay Raghavendra as Chakravarthy
Shubha Poonja as Preethi
Rangayana Raghu
Petrol Prasanna
Tabala Nani
Sanketh Kashi

Production 
Pramod Chakravarthy previously worked as one of the directors for Sugreeva (2010).

Reception 
A critic from Rediff.com gave the film a rating of one out of five stars and wrote that "Golmaal is a sheer waste of time". A critic from IANS opined that "Golmaal is disappointing to the core".

References 

Kannada cinema